Devaraj (born 20 September 1953) is an Indian actor and theatre actor who works in Indian film industry. He has largely featured in Kannada films performing various roles as a lead character, supporting character and villainous character. He has also featured in Telugu and Tamil films.

Having worked in over 200 feature films, Devaraj is popularly referred to as a "Dynamic Hero" in the Kannada film industry. Prior to acting in films, Devaraj performed in stage plays under the guidance of Shankar Nag and B. Jayashree. Devaraj has won several awards and accolades including the Karnataka State Film Award for Best Actor for his portrayal as the protagonist in the film Veerappan in 1991.

Early life

Devaraj was born on 20 September 1953 to Ramachandrappa and Krishnamma in Lingarajpuram, a locality in Bangalore, in the erstwhile Mysore State (now Karnataka). His father worked in ITC Factory, Welfare department. Devaraj lost his father when he was 3 months old as he was suffering from malaria. In 1976 due to his family's financial problems Devaraj decided to work in a HMT Watch factory, Case & Dial Section, where he worked for 9 years, and it was suggested he should act in dramas by his senior colleague at HMT, Govindaraju. Firstly Devaraj joined R.Nagesh's theatre group, later he joined B. Jayashree's theatre group SPANDANA and later on with Shankar Nag's SANKET. His film debut was as a supporting actor in 'Trishula'. He continued to appear as a supporting actor, then acted in leading roles.

Career
Devaraj auditioned for Trishula with Avinash, both of whom were part of a same theatre troupe. Both got through the auditions and the film was his debut as an actor. However, the film did not release. His first released film was 27 Mavalli Circle in 1986. After the success of 27 Mavalli Circle Devaraj acted in many more films mainly in supporting roles. His notable performances include:  His First Hero Leading Role In Hatyakanda In 1989. Upnext  Aaganthuka, Navabharatha, Indrajith among others.

After the year 2000, Devaraj switched over to character roles and debuted in Tamil and Telugu film industries. He worked in highly acclaimed films such as  Malaikottai and Villu in Tamil and Yagnam, Sri in Telugu.

Personal life
In 1986, Devaraj married actress Chandralekha, whom he had met on the sets of his film Sikku. Following this, they appeared together in the 1992 film Kendada Male. After their marriage, Chandralekha quit acting. They have two sons, Prajwal and Pranam. Both sons are active in the Kannada film industry, with Prajwal having established himself as a lead actor.

Filmography

Kannada

Telugu

Tamil
Pillaikkaga (1988)
Malaikottai  (2007)
Villu (2009)
NGK (2019)

Awards
 Nandi Award for Best Villain - Erra Mandaram

 9th SIIMA Award for Best Supporting Actor for Yajamana

References

External links

Living people
1953 births
20th-century Indian male actors
Male actors from Bangalore
Male actors in Kannada cinema
Male actors in Telugu cinema
Indian male film actors
Male actors in Tamil cinema
21st-century Indian male actors